The Vietnam Film Festival (Vietnamese: Liên hoan phim Việt Nam), founded in 1970, is a domestic film festival of Vietnam. It is considered as the major event of Cinema of Vietnam with awards for numerous categories ranging from feature film to documentary film, animated film. The festival is held for each two or three years in different host cities all over Vietnam.

History
The first Vietnam Film Festival was held from August 18 to August 25, 1970 in Hanoi following an issue of Vietnamese Ministry of Culture with the purpose of "encouraging the development of the national cinema". For each festival, there are several juries of 7 to 11 members for different categories of feature film, direct-to-video, animated film and documentary film. The most prestigious prize of the festival is the Golden Lotus (Bông sen vàng) following by the Silver Lotus and the Jury Prize.

1970–1975 period 
In this time, the country was in a period of war. Film festivals are simply organized. The first festival was held in 1970 with the criterion of summarizing four years of resistance against the US (1965–1969). The second festival in 1973 was just in time to celebrate the 20th anniversary of the Vietnamese Revolutionary Cinema. In addition to awarding awards to films produced after the first festival, the organizers also opened an award system for films produced before 1965.

1976–1985 period 
The 1977 film festival in Ho Chi Minh City was the first festival after the National Reunification Day. From then until the 7th festival in 1985, the country struggled with economic difficulties. However, the film industry is still supported by the State. The film "When the Tenth Month Comes" directed by Đặng Nhật Minh emerged as a phenomenon, winning many domestic and international awards.

1986–1999 period 
This is the Renovated Era of the country with many economic and cultural reforms. During this period, feature films were no longer supported by the State as much as before, overwhelmed in number by the emerging direct-to-video feature film line. With the common theme of couple's love, the cast of young and beautiful actors, this type of film, although not of high artistic value, attracts a large number of fans. The film festival officially opened an award system for this type of film in 1990. Its heat peaked in 1993 but quickly faded into the past and was replaced by television series.

2000–2013 period 
The film industry during this period received many new trends with the participation of private studios. The number of feature films produced is higher than before, but the quality is often not high. The industry's human resources are in a struggle between old and new ways of thinking. Film festivals of this period received a lot of criticism in their organization for that reason.

2014–present 
The number of films produced during this period increased steadily over the years and the quality gradually improved. Film festivals are also more organized. Direct-to-video feature films were officially removed from the festival in 2017 by the organizers to focus entirely on the cinematic element. The festivals are held regularly every two years, alternating with the Hanoi International Film Festival.

Programme 
The Vietnam Film Festival is organized in various sections:

 Official Selection: The main event of the festival
 In Competition: Films were selected to compete for the Golden Lotus
 Panorama Program: Films were not eligible to compete but selected to present to the public
 Short Film section (expected)
 First Film section (expected)
 Events
 Film week to celebrate the Vietnam Film Festival
 Seminar: Discussing issues of contemporary Vietnamese cinema
 Exhibition: Exhibitions often have the theme of connecting cinema with the host city or an anniversary occasion
 Exchanges: Artists with students, with the local public, with soldiers
 Visit the scenic spots in the host province
ASEAN Film Awards: The award was established in 2017 to celebrating the 50th anniversary of the founding of ASEAN

Awards
The Film Festival's current awards are:

Official Selection: In Competition 
 Golden Lotus for Best Film
 Silver Lotus
 Jury Prize (or Jury's Merit)
 Award for Best Director
 Award for Best Screenplay
 Award for Best Cinematography
 Award for Best Art Design
 Award for Best Original Score
 Award for Best Sound Design
 Award for Best Visual Effects

Feature film only
 Award for Best First Film Director
 Award for Best Actor
 Award for Best Actress
 Award for Best Supporting Actor
 Award for Best Supporting Actress
 Prospective Acting

Documentary/Science film only
 Award for Best Narrative

Animated film only
 Award for Best Shaping Animator
 Award for Best Acting Animator

Official Selection: Panorama Program 
 Audience Choice Award for the Most Favourite Feature Film, voted by the audience

Past awards 
 Technique Award for the Feature showing new and impressive cinema technique. The award was only enabled in the 14th Vietnam Film Festival (2004).
 Press Choice Award for the Best Feature Film, voted by journalists. The award was only enabled in the 16th Vietnam Film Festival (2009).
 Best Film on the subject of War and Revolution, awarded by the General Department of Politics of the Vietnam People's Army. The award was only enabled in the 19th Vietnam Film Festival (2015).
 Grand Jury Prize (or Special Jury Prize), awards depending on the year.

See also
 The Golden Kite Awards, a film award organized by Vietnam Film Association
 Hanoi International Film Festival, former as Vietnam International Film Festival
 Vietnamese International Film Festival, a film festival organized in the United States

References

 
Recurring events established in 1970